The Continental O-190 (Company designations C75 and C85) is a series of engines made by Continental Motors beginning in the 1940s. Of flat-four configuration, the engines produced 75 hp (56 kW) or 85 hp (63 kW) respectively.

The two variants shared the same bore, stroke and compression ratio. The C85 produced ten extra horsepower by virtue of having a maximum permissible rpm of 2575 versus the 2275 of the C75.

The C75 was in production from 1943 to 1952 and the C85 from 1944 to 1970.

Variants

C75
C75-8 
C75-8
C75-8F
C75-8FH
C75-8FHJ
C75-8FJ
C75-8J
C75-12
C75-12F
C75-12FH
C75-12FHJ
C75-12FJ
C75-12J
C75-12B
C75-12BF
C75-12BFH
C75-15
C75-15F

C85
C85-8
C85-8F
C85-8FHJ
C85-8FJ
C85-8J
C85-12
C85-12F
C85-12FH
C85-12FHJ
C85-12FJ
C85-12J
C85-14F
C85-15
C85-15F

Applications

C75
Auster Arrow
ERCO Ercoupe 415-C (postwar), 415-CD, 415-D, 415-H
Thorp T-11

C85

Specifications (C85)

See also

References

 Gunston, Bill. (1986) World Encyclopedia of Aero Engines. Patrick Stephens: Wellingborough.
 Erickson, Jack. Horizontally-Opposed Piston Aero Engines

O-190
Boxer engines
1940s aircraft piston engines